Frank John Wycheck (born October 14, 1971) is an American former professional football player who was a  tight end and sports talk radio host. He played college football at the University of Maryland. As a professional, Wycheck played 11 seasons for the Washington Redskins and the Tennessee Titans, where he threw the lateral pass in the Music City Miracle.  He has also spent time as a professional wrestler. Wycheck was the color commentator on the Tennessee Titans Radio Network from 2005 to 2016, and from 2004 to 2017, Wycheck co-hosted a morning sports radio show on Nashville radio station WGFX.

Early life and college
Born in Philadelphia, Wycheck attended Archbishop Ryan High School in Northeast Philadelphia and the University of Maryland, College Park.  As a freshman, Wycheck led the Atlantic Coast Conference in receptions with 58 for 509 yards, including a school record 14 catches in a game against Virginia Tech.  As a sophomore, Wycheck led the team with 45 receptions, made 2nd team All-ACC, and set the conference record for most receptions ever by a player in their first two seasons.  In Wycheck's third season, Maryland hired coach Mark Duffner, who switched the team to a run and shoot offense, which tended to use four receivers and no tight end.  As a result, Wycheck's playing time and receptions declined significantly.  However, injuries eventually forced Duffner to play Wycheck at running back, where he started the final three games of the season, rushing for more than 100 yards twice, including a 162-yard performance in Maryland's 53–23 win over the Clemson Tigers in the season finale.

"I feel like I really never got into the flow of the offense," Wycheck said after the season. "The last three games were great, but I'm a tight end type more than a running back."  He decided to forgo his senior year and enter the NFL draft, finishing his three seasons at Maryland with 134 receptions for 1,183 yards, 80 carries for 391 yards, and eight touchdowns.

Professional career

Washington Redskins
Wycheck was drafted in sixth round (160th overall) of the 1993 NFL Draft by the Washington Redskins. With the arrival of new coach Norv Turner in 1994, the Redskins made a failed attempt to switch Wycheck to fullback.  Later that same season, Wycheck was suspended by the league for testing positive for anabolic steroids.  Wycheck was released by the Redskins in 1995.

Tennessee Oilers/Titans
In 1995, Wycheck was signed by the Houston Oilers, who later became the Tennessee Titans.

Wycheck made the Pro Bowl in 1998, 1999 and 2000. Wycheck is perhaps most famous for his participation in the Music City Miracle, at the end of the 2000 wild card game against the Buffalo Bills. The Titans were down 16–15 with 16 seconds remaining. Wycheck took a hand-off from Lorenzo Neal and then threw the ball across the field to Kevin Dyson, who then turned the ball upfield 75 yards for the game-winning touchdown. The Titans would go on to make the Super Bowl that year, but would lose by a touchdown. Wycheck continued to play for the Titans before retiring after the 2003 season.

Wycheck amassed 505 receptions for 5,126 yards and 28 touchdowns over his 11-year career, one of only a few tight ends to surpass 500 receptions in NFL history (the others being Jason Witten, Shannon Sharpe, Ozzie Newsome, Kellen Winslow, Tony Gonzalez, Antonio Gates, Rob Gronkowski, Jimmy Graham, Zach Ertz, Jeremy Shockey, Vernon Davis, Kellen Winslow, Benjamin Watson, Dallas Clark, Delanie Walker, and Travis Kelce).  Wycheck led the Titans in receiving for three consecutive seasons (1999–2001). In the 1999 and 2002 postseasons, he had 14 receptions, twice tying the franchise record held by Tim Wilson and Jackie Harris. Wycheck also went 5-for-6 passing the ball in his career (all on trick plays), resulting in 148 yards, two touchdowns, and a perfect 158.3 passer rating.

Professional wrestling appearances
On May 31, 2007 Total Nonstop Action Wrestling announced that during a press conference in Nashville, that an altercation between Wycheck and James Storm disrupted events. Wycheck, with the help of Jeff Jarrett, delivered a guitar shot to James Storm after the "Tennessee Cowboy" spat beer in the former Tennessee Titan's face. TNA Wrestling would then announce that Wycheck has agreed in principle to a match with James Storm at Slammiversary on June 17, 2007. The match was made official on TNA's website later that day. At Slammiversary, he teamed with Jerry Lynn to defeat Storm and Ron Killings in a tag match. Wycheck won the match with a Cradle Piledriver, Lynn's finishing move.

Broadcasting career
In 2001, Wycheck "hosted" his own Titan player show with George Plaster and Willy Daunic on WGFX 104.5 FM until his retirement from the game. Wycheck became a co-host of the morning drive time show The Wake  Up Zone with Kevin Ingram and Mark Howard on the Nashville radio station WGFX "104.5 The Zone". Beginning with the 2005 season, Wycheck assumed color commentary duties on the Titans Radio Network.

Prior to the 2017 Titans preseason, it was announced that Wycheck would step down from being color commentator due to lingering head issues sustained in his football career. His absence was supposed to be temporary, but replacement Dave McGinnis returned for the 2018 season and subsequent seasons. In a corresponding move, Wycheck also left The Wake Up Zone morning show in 2017.

Personal life
In 1995, Wycheck married Cherryn Krol. They have two children: Deanna (born 1991) and Madison (born 1997). and are now divorced.  Wycheck was a strong supporter of the Tennessee Special Olympics, hosting the Wycheck Harley Ride charity event.

References

External links
 

1971 births
Living people
American Conference Pro Bowl players
American football tight ends
American radio sports announcers
Houston Oilers players
Maryland Terrapins football players
National Football League announcers
Players of American football from Philadelphia
Sportspeople from Philadelphia
Tennessee Oilers players
Tennessee Titans announcers
Tennessee Titans players
Washington Redskins players